113 Amalthea is a stony Florian asteroid and binary system from the inner regions of the asteroid belt, approximately  in diameter. It was discovered on 12 March 1871, by German astronomer Robert Luther at the Bilk Observatory in Düsseldorf, Germany. The elongated S-type asteroid has a rotation period of 9.95 hours. It was named after Amalthea from Greek mythology. A purported satellite of Amalthea was announced in July 2017, but was later found to be a software error in July 2021.

Description 

Amalthea is thought to be a fragment from the mantle of a Vesta-sized, 300–600 km diameter parent body that broke up around one billion years ago, with the other major remnant being 9 Metis. The spectrum of Amalthea reveals the presence of the mineral olivine, a relative rarity in the asteroid belt.

Based on observations made during a stellar occultation by Amalthea of a 10th-magnitude star on 14 March 2017, it was announced in July 2017 that the asteroid has a small, 5-kilometer-sized satellite, provisionally designated S/2017 (113) 1. However, the satellite was later retracted as a software-reduction coding error on 17 July 2021. The occultation also indicated that Amalthea has a distinctly elongated shape.

One of Jupiter's inner small satellites, unrelated to 113 Amalthea, is also called Amalthea, as is a (apparently fictional) small Arjuna asteroid in Neal Stephenson's 2015 novel Seveneves.

References

External links 
 (113) Amalthea and S/2017 (113) 1, Asteroids with Satellites Database, Johnston's Archive
 
 

000113
Discoveries by Robert Luther
Named minor planets
000113
000113
000113
18710312